Robyn J. Blader is a brigadier general in the Wisconsin Army National Guard and a practicing attorney in Wautoma, Wisconsin.

Personal
She is married to Edward Lucht. They have two children.

Military career
Blader originally enlisted in the United States Army Reserve. She later joined the Wisconsin Army National Guard and was commissioned an officer through the Army Reserve Officers' Training Corps.

After serving as a radio channel operator, she eventually joined the Military Police Company. Later, she became a judge advocate and eventually a military judge. From 2011 to 2012, Blader was deployed to serve in Operation Enduring Freedom. In 2018, she was named Assistant Adjutant General for Readiness and Training of the Wisconsin Army National Guard.

Awards she has received include the Bronze Star Medal, the Meritorious Service Medal with oak leaf cluster, the Army Commendation Medal, the Army Achievement Medal with oak leaf cluster, the Army Reserve Components Achievement Medal with four oak leaf clusters, the National Defense Service Medal with service star, the Afghanistan Campaign Medal with service star, the Global War on Terrorism Service Medal, the Military Outstanding Volunteer Service Medal, the Armed Forces Reserve Medal with silver hourglass and 'M' devices, the Army Service Ribbon, the Overseas Service Ribbon and the NATO Medal.

Education
University of Wisconsin-Oshkosh
University of Wisconsin Law School – University of Wisconsin-Madison
Touro University International
The Judge Advocate General's School
United States Army War College
United States Army Command and General Staff College

References

People from Wautoma, Wisconsin
Wisconsin National Guard personnel
National Guard (United States) generals
Female generals of the United States Army
American military lawyers
United States Army personnel of the War in Afghanistan (2001–2021)
Wisconsin lawyers
University of Wisconsin–Oshkosh alumni
University of Wisconsin Law School alumni
United States Army War College alumni
United States Army Command and General Staff College alumni
Living people
Year of birth missing (living people)
The Judge Advocate General's Legal Center and School alumni
21st-century American women